Pampasatyrus is a Neotropical genus of butterflies in the family Nymphalidae.

Species
Pampasatyrus glaucope (C. & R. Felder, [1867])
Pampasatyrus gyrtone (Berg, 1877)
Pampasatyrus imbrialis (Weeks, 1901)
Pampasatyrus nilesi (Weeks, 1902)
Pampasatyrus ocelloides (Schaus, 1902)
Pampasatyrus periphas (Godart, [1824])
Pampasatyrus quies (Berg, 1877)
Pampasatyrus reticulata (Weymer, 1907)
Pampasatyrus yacantoensis (Köhler, 1939)

References

Satyrinae
Nymphalidae of South America
Nymphalidae genera